Cymindis latiuscula is a species of ground beetle in the subfamily Harpalinae. It was described by Maximilien Chaudoir in 1875.

References

latiuscula
Beetles described in 1875